is a junction passenger railway station located in the city of Kōchi city, the capital of Kōchi Prefecture, Japan.  It is operated by JR Shikoku and has the station number "D43".

Lines

Although  is the official western terminus of the third-sector Tosa Kuroshio Railway Asa Line (also known as the Gomen-Nahari Line), all its rapid and some local trains continue towards  on the Dosan Line tracks with Tosa-Ikku as one of their intermediate stops.

Layout
The station, which is unstaffed, consists of two side platforms (not opposed) serving two tracks. A small waiting room has been erected to one side of the tracks. A ramp leads up to one platform from the waiting room. A footbridge is used to access the other platform. Designated bicycle parking lots are provided near the waiting room.

Adjacent stations

|-
!colspan=5|JR Shikoku

|-
!colspan=5|Tosa Kuroshio Railway

History
The station opened on 5 December 1925 as an intermediate stop when the then Kōchi Line (now Dosan Line) was extended from Kōchi eastwards and then northwards towards . At that time the station was operated by Japanese Government Railways, later becoming Japanese National Railways (JNR). With the privatization of JNR on 1 April 1987, control of the station passed to JR Shikoku.

Surrounding area
Kochi Prefectural Kochi Higashi High School
 Japan National Route 195 Bypass (Akebono Highway)
Kokubun River
Tosa Shrine

See also
 List of Railway Stations in Japan

References

External links

 JR Shikoku timetable

Railway stations in Kōchi Prefecture
Railway stations in Japan opened in 1925
Kōchi